TidalHealth Peninsula Regional is a non-profit hospital located in Salisbury, Maryland.

Established in 1897 by Dr. George W. Todd with six beds in an old home, the institution once known as Peninsula General Hospital has grown to contain approximately 300 beds.
It serves nearly 500,000 patients every year in a multitude of specialties. Close to 2,000 babies are born at TidalHealth Peninsula Regional every year. There are approximately 3,300 employees, placing it among Salisbury's largest employers.

Outside of its main hospital location, it includes a network of specialty and family physicians, a network of labs and pharmacies, plus two health complexes in Millsboro, Delaware and Ocean Pines, Maryland.

Steven Leonard has been President/CEO since January 2018.

In January 2020, Peninsula Health System, parent of the then named Peninsula Regional Medical Center, merged with Nanticoke Health Services of Seaford, Delaware. On September 1, 2020, the health system was officially renamed TidalHealth Services. The renaming coincided with a rebranding of all affiliated institutions with the TidalHealth branding.

Medical specialties
Specialties include  
Comprehensive Cardiac Care (including Open Heart Surgery and Rehab) at the Guerrieri Heart & Vascular Institute
Comprehensive Cancer Treatment at the Richard A. Henson Cancer Institute
Diagnostic and Imaging Services
Emergency and Trauma Care
Outpatient Surgical Services
Neurosurgery
Orthopaedics (including total joint replacement) and Rehabilitation
Breast Center
Special Care Nursery
Heartburn Treatment Center
Sleep Center
Women's and Children's Services 
Wound Care
Outpatient Physical, Occupational and Speech Therapy & Rehabilitation
Pediatric and neonatal services, provided in collaboration with Children's National Medical Center
Psychiatric Services, in partnership with Adventist HealthCare
Access to Clinical Trials (Peninsula Regional is part of the Johns Hopkins Clinical Research Network)

Accreditation
TidalHealth Peninsula Regional is an accredited Hospital and Laboratory by the Joint Commission. Its Joint Commission certifications include Advanced Total Hip and Total Knee Replacement, 

Primary Stroke Center, Acute Myocardial Infarction, and Spine Surgery.

References

External links
 Official website

Hospitals in Maryland
Hospitals established in 1898